Dr. John W. Messick House and Office is a historic home and office located at Georgetown, Sussex County, Delaware. It was built in 1876 and is a -story, three bay, "L" shaped frame dwelling with a two-story, five bay rear wing. It has a recessed turret structure attached at the front as a fourth bay.  The house is in a Late Gothic Revival style with a mansard roof in the Second Empire style.

The site was added to the National Register of Historic Places in 1987.

References

Houses on the National Register of Historic Places in Delaware
Second Empire architecture in Delaware
Queen Anne architecture in Delaware
Gothic Revival architecture in Delaware
Houses completed in 1876
Houses in Georgetown, Delaware
National Register of Historic Places in Sussex County, Delaware